Iran do Espirito Santo (born 1963) is a Brazilian artist, based in São Paulo.

His work is included in the collection of the Museum of Modern Art in New York. He has exhibited at the Venice Biennale and the Bienal de São Paulo.

Iran do Espirito Santo is well known for his minimalist sculptures that have a "meditative tranquility". His work takes common industrial objects and places them into a new domain of "ethereal purity"  by using materials such as glass, stainless steel, plaster and stone.

References

 Irish Museum of Modern Art and Lilian Tone, Optimal conditions of visibility: Iran do Espírito Santo's perfectly implausible works, Irish Museum of Modern Art

External links
 Iran do Espirito Santo SKNY artists

1963 births
Living people
Brazilian contemporary artists